The Aura Gallery is an art gallery in Beijing, China.

History
Established in Shanghai, the gallery opened in 2000. Since its establishment, the gallery has become a leader in the search and promotion of Chinese contemporary art. In August 2009, the gallery was moved to Chaoyang District in Beijing.

The gallery also works to promote Western art into the Asian markets. The gallery also provides its services to organizations and individual collectors.

Exhibitions 
The gallery has exhibited numerous art including Art Beijing, SH Contemporary, Luo Quanmu - Butterfly Catching, and BANG!: Liu Dahong and Qu Guangci.

Taiwan branch

The gallery plans to establish a branch in Taiwan in April 2014 at Dunhua South Road, Daan, Taipei at a cost of NT$ 150 million.

References

2000 establishments in China
Art galleries established in 2000
Art museums and galleries in China
Buildings and structures in Chaoyang District, Beijing
Tourist attractions in Beijing